War of the Wizards may refer to:
 War of the Wizards (gamebook), a gamebook by Ian Page
 War of the Wizards (album), a 1992 album by Stormwitch